Krishna Prasad Sitaula is a Nepali politician, belonging to the Nepali Congress. Krishna Sitaula is known for playing an important role during the comprehensive peace accord.

Political career 

Sitaula was nominated general secretary of the party by president Sushil Koirala. A close confidant of the Koirala family, Sitaula served as Home Minister and Deputy prime minister in 2006.

Sitaula won 1994 by-elections and 1999 elections from Jhapa 1. He had won from Jhapa 3 in the second constituent assembly election.

Sitaula lost the 2021 elections due to betrayal from RPP, which had forged a nationwide alliance with Nepali Congress. It fielded Rajendra Prasad Lingden and allied with CPN (UML) to overthrow Sitaula.

References

Living people
Nepali Congress politicians from Koshi Province
Members of the 2nd Nepalese Constituent Assembly
Nepal MPs 1991–1994
Nepal MPs 1999–2002
1946 births